This article lists events that occurred during 1918 in Estonia.

Incumbents

Events
 1 February – new calendar: Julian calendar is replaced by Gregorian. This means that 1 February becomes 14 February.
 24 February –	Estonian Declaration of Independence.
 End of February: Germans in power.
 3 March –	Treaty of Brest-Litovsk. Bolshevist Russia cedes sovereignty over Estonia to Germany.
 11 November – Germans began withdrawal and turn over power to the provisional government of Estonia (headed by Konstantin Päts).
 11 November – Estonian Defence League is founded.
 22 November – Estonia was invaded by Bolshevist Russian forces. Beginning of Estonian War of Independence.
 National Library of Estonia established.
 Tallinn College of Engineering and Higher Music School established.

Births

Deaths

References

 
1910s in Estonia
Estonia
Estonia
Years of the 20th century in Estonia